Abdollahabad (also Romanized as ‘Abdollahābād; also known as ‘Abdolābād) is a village in Takht-e Jolgeh Rural District, in the Central District of Firuzeh County, Razavi Khorasan Province, Iran. At the 2006 census, its population was 20, in 6 families.

See also 

 List of cities, towns and villages in Razavi Khorasan Province

References 

Populated places in Firuzeh County